Miracavira brillians is a moth of the family Noctuidae first described by William Barnes in 1901. It is found in North America, including Arizona.

The wingspan is about 37 mm.

Larvae have been reared on Ptelea trifoliata.

References

Amphipyrinae
Moths described in 1901